Weedon Lois (or Lois Weedon) is a village in Weston and Weedon civil parish, about  west of Towcester, Northamptonshire, England. 

The villages name means 'Heathen temple hill'. There is a well in the parish, named after St. Loys or Lewis, whose waters apparently cured the Blind and Leprous.

Before Christianity came there may have been an Anglo-Saxon pagan temple here.

The oldest parts of the Church of England parish church of SS Mary and Peter date from about 1100. It is a Grade II* listed building. The authors Edith Sitwell and her brother Sacheverell Sitwell are buried in the churchyard, as are Michael Aris and American author James Purdy.

References

Further reading

External links

Anglo-Saxon paganism
Villages in Northamptonshire
West Northamptonshire District